Savage Mondo Blitzers were a line of miniature collectible toy figures on skateboards produced by Kenner in 1991 and sold in the United States, Italy, Greece, and Argentina. They were about an inch tall. They came in sets of four skaters per pack, each set had a different gang, and each skater his own personality.

Gangs
There were 9 gangs released in the USA including a deluxe pack:

Damaged and Deadly Gang - Blood Hockey, Mr. Mutator Head, Chop Chop, Head Alert
The Dudes of Disaster - Bad Fart, Blade Invader, Killer Kommando, Twin Geeks
The Butt Kickers - Snot Shot, Secret Weapon, Gun Runner, Cleat Meat
The Chunk Blowers - Tyrannosaurus Ax, Loaded Diaper, Direct Hit, Big Hans
The Skull Crunchers - Fat Ax, Pork Chopper, Bad to the Bone, Roach Kill
Concrete Breakfast Gang - Metal Head, Shark Bait, Knight to Dismember, and Barf Bucket
Scars and Spikes Gang - Kiss My Bat, Aping Wound, Lug Nut, Eye Pus
The Sewer Surfers - Numb Chuck, Robozooka, Bad Audience, Butterfly Gone Bad
Crazy 8 with 'Lightning Launcher' - Destruction Worker, Lawn Disorder, Chow Hound, General Mayhem, Armed & Dangerous, Fist Fight, Shishke Bob, and Jack Hammer.

Although pictures of the following gangs appeared on the back of the packaging, they were never released in the USA:

Brains Not Included - Wedgyson, Fly'd Out, Gutter Brawl, Salad Bartender
Puke Shooters Gang - Hex Bolt, Gas Attack, Leg Up, Bad Apple

These figures are very rare and can only be found in the Italian and Greek versions of the toys.

Foreign versions
In Italy the toys were renamed 'Gli Skatenati.' In Greece; 'Skateboard Mania.' They were blind packaged with one in a pack as opposed to the four-packs seen in the USA. The unreleased figures seen in the 'Brains Not Included' and 'Puke Shooters Gang' packs were available only in these foreign lines. 

Although having the same figure molds as the USA line, many of them were painted different colors than their USA counterparts. Gangs and characters were renamed to make more sense within the Greek or Italian language.

One of the Savage Mondo Blitzers toys, Chow Hound, can be seen briefly in The Adventures of Pete & Pete episode "Nightcrawlers".

Action figures